The Payne Stewart Award is an award given by the PGA Tour and presented by Southern Company since the award's inception in 2000. The award, given annually the week of the Tour Championship at East Lake Golf Club, is in honor of World Golf Hall of Famer Payne Stewart.

The Payne Stewart Award is given to a player whose "values align with the character, charity and sportsmanship that Stewart showed". This includes respect for the traditions of the game, commitment to uphold the game's heritage of charitable support and professional and meticulous presentation of himself and the sport through his dress and conduct.

Winners

2022  Billy Andrade
2021  Justin Rose
2020  Zach Johnson
2019  Hale Irwin
2018  Bernhard Langer
2017  Stewart Cink
2016  Jim Furyk
2015  Ernie Els
2014  Nick Faldo
2013  Peter Jacobsen
2012  Steve Stricker
2011  David Toms
2010  Tom Lehman
2009  Kenny Perry
2008  Davis Love III
2007  Hal Sutton
2006  Gary Player
2005  Brad Faxon
2004  Jay Haas
2003  Tom Watson
2002  Nick Price
2001  Ben Crenshaw
2000  Byron Nelson, Jack Nicklaus,  Arnold Palmer

References

PGA Tour
Golf awards in the United States
Sportsmanship trophies and awards
Awards established in 2000